Hotel Colonial is a 1987 American adventure film directed by Cinzia Th. Torrini, and written by Enzo Monteleone, Cinzia Th. Torrini, Robert Katz and Ira Barmak. The film stars John Savage, Rachel Ward, Massimo Troisi, Robert Duvall and Anna Galiena. The film was released on September 18, 1987, by Orion Pictures.

Plot

Cast 
John Savage as Marco Venieri
Rachel Ward as Irene Costa
Massimo Troisi as Werner
Robert Duvall as Roberto Carrasco 
Anna Galiena as Francesca Venieri
Claudio Báez as Anderson
Zaide Silvia Gutiérrez as Linda
Tariq Hager as Luca at 17
Daniel Sommer as Marco at 13
Isela Díaz as Indian Child
Demián Bichir as Young Hotel Clerk
Jorge Abraham as Man in Jail 1
René Pereyra as Man in Jail 2
Carlos De Leon as Old Man in Jail
René Barrera as Bookmaker at Cock Fight
Carlos Romano as Bartender in Nuevo Venicio
Roberto Sosa as Street Kid
Honorato Magaloni as Bookmaker with Soccer Team
Roger Bronte as Television Newscaster
Federico Gonzáles as Captain Santillana
Loló Navarro as Woman on Bus
Cesar Sanvicente as Taxi Driver
Edmundo Barahona as Embassy Receptionist
Milbugo Trevino as Clerk at Hotel Estacion
Manuel Fierro as Man at Pier
Teresa Mendoza as Prostitute
Araceli Jurado as Girl at Bed
Juan Hernández as Clerk at Hotel Pacifico
Pedro Pucheta as Bus Driver
Daniel Santa Lucía as Mendoza
Josh Lukins as Film Narrator

References

External links 
 
 

1987 films
1980s adventure films
Orion Pictures films
Films scored by Pino Donaggio
American adventure films
1980s English-language films
1980s American films